Todor Petrov Kolev (26 August 1939 – 15 February 2013) was a leading Bulgarian film and stage actor, singer, comedian and TV presenter.

Born in Shumen, his first major film was Tsar i General (Tsar and General) in 1966. He has appeared in more than 30 films. He is best known to the Bulgarian audience by his roles in comedies such as Gospodin za edin den (King for a day), Dvoynikat (The Double), Prebroyavane na Divite Zaytsi (The Hare Census), Tsarska Piesa (Royal Play), Posledniyat Ergen (The Last Bachelor), Opasen Char (Dangerous Charm).

During the Communist rule, he was temporarily exiled from Sofia to Sliven for a joke he made in public that there were three Toshkos who made Bulgarians laugh ("Toshko" is the diminutive form of the name Todor in Bulgarian): the Communist leader Todor Zhivkov, the clown Toshko Kozarev and himself. However, in his biography Varnenskoto Sofianche Ot Shumen, Todor Kolev denies having ever said this.

Todor Kolev was a host of the late night TV show "Kak Shte Gi Stignem with Todor Kolev" (1994-1998) and "Free Entry" (1998-1999).

He died on 15 February 2013 in Sofia, after serious illness of lung cancer.

Filmography

References

Sources

External links 
 

1939 births
2013 deaths
Bulgarian male film actors
Bulgarian male stage actors
Bulgarian male television actors
Bulgarian comedians
20th-century Bulgarian male singers
Deaths from cancer in Bulgaria
Deaths from lung cancer
Members of the National Assembly (Bulgaria)
Union of Democratic Forces (Bulgaria) politicians
People from Shumen
20th-century Bulgarian male actors
National Academy for Theatre and Film Arts alumni
Academic staff of the National Academy for Theatre and Film Arts